Chasing Coral is a 2017 American documentary film about a team of divers, scientists and photographers around the world who document the disappearance of coral reefs. Chasing Coral was produced by Exposure Labs and directed by Jeff Orlowski. It premiered at the 2017 Sundance Film Festival and was released globally on Netflix as a Netflix Original Documentary in July 2017. Jeff Orlowski has previously directed the movie Chasing Ice in 2012 which share a similar plot to Chasing Coral.

Soundtrack
Saul Simon MacWilliams and Dan Romer composed the score for the film. Romer also co-wrote an original song, "Tell Me How Long", featuring Kristen Bell.

Reception
The film won the Audience Award for U.S. Documentary at the 2017 Sundance Film Festival.

References

External links
 
 
 
 
 

2017 in the environment
American documentary films
2017 documentary films
Documentary films about environmental issues
Documentary films about water and the environment
2017 films
Films scored by Dan Romer
Documentary films about photographers
Nature photography
Netflix original documentary films
2010s English-language films
2010s American films
Documentary films about global warming
Documentary films about marine biology